The Lost 15 Boys: The Big Adventure on Pirates' Island is a 2013 Chinese-Japanese animated adventure film directed by Xiaohan, Mao Qichao, Ba Yunfeng, Zhang Bing and Ryūtarō Nakamura. It is based on the novel Two Years' Vacation by Jules Verne. The film was released on November 16, 2013, in Japan and on October 1, 2014, in China.

Voice cast
Li Miao
Yu Peixuan
Zhou Yongxi
Xiao Kaifei
Zhang Mingxue

Reception
By October 7, the film had earned ¥1.45 million at the Chinese box office.

References

External links

2010s adventure films
2013 animated films
2013 films
2013 anime films
Adventure anime and manga
Animated adventure films
China Film Group Corporation films
Chinese animated films
Japanese adventure films
Films based on works by Jules Verne